Skuld may refer to:

 Skuld, one of a group of three norns in Norse mythology
 Skuld (princess), a princess in Norse mythology
 1130 Skuld, an asteroid discovered on 2 September 1929 and named after the Norn
 Skuld (Oh My Goddess!), a fictional character named after the Norn in the anime/manga series Oh My Goddess!
 Assuranceforeningen Skuld, a marine insurance company, based in Oslo
 , a cargo ship in service 1947-48